Henri Deberly, born in 1882 in Amiens (France) and died in 1947, was a French writer, winner of the Prix Goncourt in 1926.

His avant-garde tomb in Viroflay is by the artist René Iché.

Works
 Élégies et sonnets, 1911
 Un Homme et un autre. 1920
 L'impudente, Nouvelle Revue Française, 1923
 Prosper et Broudilfagne. 1924
 Pancloche. Cinquième édition 1925
 L'ennemi des siens, Nouvelle Revue Française, 1925
 Le Supplice de Phèdre,  Nouvelle Revue Française. 1926
 Luce et Thierry, Nouvelle Revue Française, 1927
 Tombes sans lauriers, Nouvelle Revue Française. 1929
 L'agonisant ..., Gallimard, 1931
 La maison des trois veuves, Gallimard, 1935
 La Comtesse de Farbus. Gallimard, 1937
 La Pauvre Petite Madame Chouin. 1939

Reviews
"Review: Studies in French Literature: The Best French Short Stories of 1926-27, and the Yearbook of the French Short Story by Richard Eaton, Maximilian Rudwin, The Sewanee Review, Vol. 36, No. 4 (Oct., 1928), pp. 508-509 

1882 births
1947 deaths
People from Amiens
20th-century French novelists
Writers from Hauts-de-France
French male novelists
20th-century French male writers
Prix Goncourt winners